The 1998 Campionati Internazionali di San Marino was a men's tennis tournament played on Clay in City of San Marino, San Marino that was part of the International Series of the 1998 ATP Tour. It was the tenth edition of the tournament and was held from 10 to 16 August 1998.

Seeds
Champion seeds are indicated in bold text while text in italics indicates the round in which those seeds were eliminated.

Draw

Finals

Top half

Bottom half

References

Singles
San Marino CEPU Open